Gustav Manker (March 29, 1913 – July 7, 1988 in Vienna) was an Austrian theatre and TV film director and stage designer. From 1968 to 1979 he was the director of the Volkstheater in Vienna. His TV films include Das Konzert  (1971), Gegen Torheit gibt es kein Mittel (1974) and Das Märchen (1976). His son Paulus is also a reputable film director and actor.

References

Further reading 
 Paulus Manker: Der Theatermann Gustav Manker. Spurensuche. Amalthea, Wien 2010 
 100 Jahre Volkstheater. Theater. Zeit. Geschichte. Jugend und Volk, Wien-München 1989 
 Andreas Kloner: Gustav Manker. Der Theatervater. ORF-Radiofeature 2013, 48 Min.

External links
 

Austrian theatre directors
Austrian theatre managers and producers
Austrian television directors
Theatre designers
1913 births
1988 deaths
Mass media people from Vienna
Theatre people from Vienna